Punrasar is a village in Bikaner district in the Indian state of Rajasthan.

Geography

Punrasar Balaji Temple

Punrasar Balaji is a famous holy site in village dedicated to the Hindu deity Hanuman.

References

Villages in Bikaner district